Doug Young (born April 9, 1955) is a sculptor of life-size bronze statues. He lives in South Carolina, United States.

Young studied under well-known South Carolina artists Emery Bopp, Darell Koons, and Carl Blair as well as the sculptor and restoration artist Adrianus Van Der Staak.

Young has lived in North or South Carolina since 1973 and moved to Greenville, South Carolina in 1992. His works include a life-size sculpture of ‘Shoeless’ Joe Jackson, which stands at Greenville's West End. The 'Shoeless' Joe Jackson statue was unveiled on July 13, 2002.

Young's other life size works include:
 Gethsemane a commissioned work for North Greenville University in Tigerville, South Carolina
 The Patriot for J. L. Mann High School
 Della Gillette commissioned by Pi Beta Phi to commemorate the Pi Beta Phi settlement school in Gatlinburg, Tennessee.

References

External links 
 Interview on SouthernEdition.com
 Defy Yourself Media coverage
 Interview on CreateGreenville.org

Living people
1955 births
Sculptors from South Carolina
20th-century American sculptors
20th-century American male artists
21st-century American sculptors
21st-century American male artists
American male sculptors